The 1923–24 season was the 15th year of football played by Dundee United, and covers the period from 1 July 1923 to 30 June 1924.

Match results
Dundee United played a total of 39 matches during the 1923–24 season.

Legend

All results are written with Dundee United's score first.
Own goals in italics

Second Division

Scottish Cup

References

Dundee United F.C. seasons
Dundee United